{{DISPLAYTITLE:C27H39NO2}}
The molecular formula C27H39NO2 (molar mass: 409.60 g/mol, exact mass: 409.2981 u) may refer to:

 VDM-11
 Veratramine